Valkyrie is the sixteenth studio album by American progressive rock band Glass Hammer. It was released on September 27, 2016. It is the last studio album to feature guitarist Kamran Alan Shikoh.

It is the band's first concept album since 2012's Perilous; the story follows "a soldier's struggle to return home from the horrors of war, to the girl who loves him and must ultimately find her way to him."

Track listing

Personnel 

Glass Hammer
 Susie Bogdanowicz – lead vocals
 Alan Shikoh – electric, acoustic and classical guitars, electric sitar
 Steve Babb – bass, keyboards, lead vocals
 Fred Schendel –  keyboards, guitars, lead vocals
 Aaron Raulston – drums

Production
 Fred Schendel and Steve Babb – producing
 Bob Katz – mastering
 Michal Xaay Loranc – cover art, booklet art

References 

Glass Hammer albums
2016 albums